Buffy the Vampire Slayer: Play With Fire is a trade paperback from the UK collecting comic stories based on the Buffy television series.

Story description

General Synopsis

A fight involving Xander at school is broken up by a huge scorpion. A new range of dolls turn out to be demonic. And Oz turns from cuteness to raving wolf. These are just some of the mini-stories found in this collection, which includes:

Dark Horse/Wizard #1/2 special

This story focuses on Xander. He is pushed around at School, Xander stands up to the challenge and later literally faces his demon.

Collected together a number of rarer Buffy comic stories previously printed in TV Guide, Dark Horse Extra, Wizard 1/2 Buffy the Vampire Slayer, and the Buffy Annual 1999.

The Dark Horse/Wizard #1/2 special limited edition comic book was presented by Dark Horse Comics and Wizard Magazine and came with a certificate of authenticity.

Continuity
Supposed to be set in early Buffy Season 3.

Canonical issues

Buffy comics such as this one are not usually considered by fans as canonical. Some fans consider them stories from the imaginations of authors and artists, while other fans consider them as taking place in an alternative fictional reality. However unlike fan fiction, overviews summarising their story, written early in the writing process, were 'approved' by both Fox and Joss Whedon (or his office), and the books were therefore later published as officially Buffy merchandise. 

Comics based on Buffy the Vampire Slayer